Oulton Park is a hard surfaced track used for motor racing, close to the village of Little Budworth, Cheshire, England. It occupies much of the area which was previously known as the Oulton Estate. The racing circuit is owned and operated by Jonathan Palmer's MotorSport Vision organisation.

Circuit

The track is characterised by rapidly changing gradients, blind crests and several tight corners. The highest part of the course is Hill Top. Paddock facilities are reasonable in size with large areas of hard-standing and some power points.

The race track can be adapted for shorter courses. The British Touring Car Championships uses all of the Cascades Corner and Lakeside but then forks off into a hairpin before Island Bend. This hairpin cuts out all of the Island section of the circuit and takes the cars straight back over Hill Top.

Beginning in 2007, all the circuit's marshalling stations were redesigned with protective cages. This was to prevent incidents similar to those seen in the 2006 season when cars had collided with marshalling posts. A cage-protected marshals station was also built at the bottom of the back straight near the chicane preceding Knickerbrook.

Knickerbrook corner

The corner is named after an event that occurred when the British demolition expert and raconteur, Blaster Bates, was removing tree stumps with dynamite close to the corner with a colleague. After the first detonation, a courting couple were seen to run off at speed and in some disarray from a nearby a bush or bank. On the closer investigation, the pair discovered some ladies underwear in the brook and this resulted in the naming of the corner.

Despite its colourful name, it was a notorious corner on circuit because of accidents and driver fatalities. The death of Paul Warwick in 1991 led to a chicane being added at the entry to the corner. Before Warwick's death, the bend had a reputation as a "racers' corner" because it demanded a driver's full commitment and total courage. Originally it was a fifth gear, off camber right-hand bend at the end of a downhill straight called Hilltop. Deep kerbing on the inside of the corner combined with an off camber could easily affect a cars' handling causing it to veer to the outside of the circuit.  As an Armco barrier on the outside of the corner eventually intersected with the grass verge, there was a significant lack of run off area for drivers forced wide on the bend.

Since 1991, a right-left chicane (named Hislop's) was installed about  before Knickerbrook to reduce the speed of cars coming down Hilltop.

History

Origins – 1950s
In the early 18th century the Oulton Estate comprised a manor house and a formal garden surrounded by Cheshire farmland. By the end of the century this farmland was converted into a park, which now is the site of Oulton Park. Some buildings that were part of the estate still exist; the entrance gates, lodges and screen designed by Joseph Turner. During the Second World War, Oulton Park's grounds were used as one of the staging camps for US Army units under the command of General Patton (he stayed at nearby Peover Hall) before the Normandy landings in 1944. American World Heavyweight Champion boxer Joe Louis put on several exhibition bouts for the troops garrisoned at Oulton Park. The fights were staged within the vicinity of the Deer Leap section of the modern circuit. After the war, much of the estate remained unused. The estate's original house had been destroyed by fire in 1926 leaving vacant parkland.

By the early 1950s England had a number of motor racing tracks but the northwest was not well served. The members of the Mid-Cheshire Car Club took it on themselves to rectify the situation. The circuit they developed was on the estate of the Grey-Egerton family.

The first meeting took place on 8 August, but the RAC would not allow the public to attend, wanting an opening meeting to be run successfully before allowing paying spectators; nonetheless some 3,000 club members and their guests attended as spectators. The main event of the day was the 33-lap  Formula Two race, won by Tony Rolt driving Rob Walker's Connaught A Type. The supporting Formula III event was divided into three 10-lap heats (won by Don Trueman, Charles Headland and Don Parker) and a 17-lap final which went to Les Leston.

Oulton Park has a vast catchment area which includes Liverpool, Manchester, Chester and Crewe so it is little surprise that the second meeting and last of 1953, on 3 October, attracted a crowd of 40,000. It was a joint motorcycle and car event, the Wirral 100 Motor Club joining the Mid-Cheshire Car Club in organising it. The car side of the day was confined to three Formula III races and a final, which was won by Glaswegian Ninian Sanderson from Ken Tyrrell.

Oulton Park is unique amongst the new post-World War II circuits in that it is a true road circuit whilst its contemporaries were, with one exception, converted airfields (the exception being the short-lived Blandford). It has something in common with Mallory Park in that it can trace its history back a very long way (possibly as far as Roman times) and is mentioned in the Doomsday Book as ‘Aleton’.

The British Racing Drivers' Club (BRDC) brought the British Empire Trophy to Oulton Park in 1954 and ran it for sports cars on the new  Island Circuit. Alan Brown won the race in a Cooper-Bristol from Roy Salvadori, driving a Maserati A6GCS, who set a new lap record at 74.73 mph.

In August, Oulton Park saw its first international meeting when the Daily Dispatch sponsored the Oulton Park Gold Cup. Apart from the 11-year period when Aintree ran international Formula One races, it fell to Oulton Park to bring the major formulae to the northwest of England and the Gold Cup was run for all the major formulae: Formula One, Formula Two, Formula 5000 and the big sport cars. Its first running over the second new circuit of the year, the 2.761 mile International circuit, and was for Formula One; the entry was entirely British with the exception of Jean Behra in his Gordini. There were 19 starters; Stirling Moss started from the back of the grid in his new Maserati 250F which had only arrived from the factory on the morning of the race. By the end of lap one, he had passed twelve of his rivals and took the lead from Reg Parnell's Ferrari 625 on the fourth lap to win by 1min 14.4sec at the end of the 36-lap race. Bob Gerard's Cooper-Bristol and Don Beauman's Connaught were the only two other cars on the same lap as Moss. This was the first of Moss's victories in the Gold Cup – he went on to win it another four times, repeating the win in 1955, 1959, 1960 and 1961.

In 1956 the Vintage Sports Car Club brought the Richard Seaman Memorial Trophy Race to Oulton Park from Silverstone, but the BRSCC's Daily Herald Trophy for sport cars was almost rained off. The race was reduced from 56 to 40 laps and the Le Mans-winning Ecurie Ecosse team was withdrawn. Moss won in his works Aston Martin DB3S from his teammate Tony Brooks.

Ahead of the 1957 season, Moss and Brooks tested the Vanwalls at Oulton and advised that the surface should be replaced at Island Bend. Their advice was acted on.

1960s

There was a new look to the Cheshire circuit for the 1961 season, the pits being rebuilt into a two-storey affair with a concrete wall to protect the pit crews when working on their charges. The Oulton Park Trophy was a televised event for GT cars which was won by Mike Parkes in the Maranello Concessionaires Ferrari 250GT from Graham Hill in a Jaguar E-Type and Tony Maggs in an Aston Martin DB4GT; Innes Ireland fought his way to fourth in another 250GT after a poor start, setting a new lap record on the way.

The 1961 Gold Cup was Moss's final Cup win, in a unique car. The race was run in damp conditions and this enabled Moss to take the flag with the four-wheel drive Ferguson P99. It was the only race victory for the 4WD F1 car although the car did win the 1964 British Hill Climb Championship.

Oulton Park was bought by Grovewood Securities in 1964, to increase the Company's motor sport portfolio, and later in the year Grovewood also acquired the freehold, thereby ending nearly 500 years of ownership by the Egerton family. Grovewood's takeover coincided with the increase in required safety measures. Being set in parkland, Oulton Park was more difficult and more expensive to bring up to standard than other circuits but the decision to make motorsport first and parkland second was effected.

The spring meeting that year had a distinctly Scottish flavour, Jimmy Clark winning the sports, GT and saloon car races and Jackie Stewart, starting out in International career, winning the Formula Three race in Ken Tyrrell's Cooper-Austin. Clark was the reigning World Champion yet had time to enter a relatively minor meeting in England.

1965 saw the revival of the world's oldest motor race when the Royal Automobile Club's Tourist Trophy came to the Cheshire track. It was run for Sports and GT cars in two 2-hour heats and was won by Denny Hulme in a 2-litre Brabham BT8.

On 2 April 1966, prospective spectators at the British Automobile Racing Club's Oulton Park 200 were turned away, as the circuit was covered in snow. Good Friday 1969 saw the birth of Formula 5000 in Europe: Peter Gethin had a runaway win driving the Church Farm Racing McLaren M10A.

The last RAC Tourist Trophy to be run at Oulton Park took place on Whit Monday 1969 and ended in tragedy. Paul Hawkins lost control of his Lola T70 at Island Bend and hit a tree; he was killed instantly and the race stopped, Trevor Taylor (who had bravely tried to save Hawkins from the blazing wreck) being declared the winner.

1970s

Good Friday 1971 saw Formula One return to the Cheshire circuit to contest the Rothmans Trophy.

Until 1973 racing had always been restricted to Saturdays and Bank Holidays but that year the local council gave permission for four Sunday meetings – but it was to last for only a year. That first Sunday meeting on 13 May featured F5000 as the top race of the day and saw a 1-2-3 win for Chevron, victory going to Teddy Pilette.

1980s – 1990s 

In 1987 a chicane was added between the Shell Oils Hairpin and Knickerbrook, with the intention of reducing speed to improve safety at what was the fastest section of the circuit.

At the close of the 2000 season the outright lap record on the International circuit stood to the credit of Gareth Rees, driving a Reynard 95D in the British Formula Two Championship on 6 July 1996. The outright lap record on the Fosters circuit was held by Luca Riccitelli in a Formula 3000 car in 50.09secs.

2000s – present

The Knickerbrook chicane was re-modelled slightly between 2002 and 2003, aiming to slow the cars through Knickerbrook up Clay Hill and onto Druids.

Oulton Park remains a popular venue, having been brought up to modern standards following the circuit's acquisition by MotorSport Vision (MSV). After many years of decay, Oulton was given new life when it, along with Brands Hatch, Snetterton and Cadwell Park, was purchased by the group in January 2004. MSV, headed by ex-F1 racer Jonathan Palmer, have completely turned the circuits around, tidying them up and pulling the crowds in.

The circuit hosts rounds of the British Touring Car Championship, two visits for the British Superbike Championship, and the season opener for the British GT Championship, while the Historic Gold Cup classic car meeting in August is dubbed 'the Goodwood of the north'. Crowds have increased noticeably in recent years, with the BTCC meeting in 2014 attracting a record attendance of 43,000.

Current major racing events
Oulton Park currently hosts the following major UK race championships:
British Touring Car Championship
British GT Championship
British Superbike Championship
GB3 Championship

The HSCC Oulton Park Gold Cup has also become one of the biggest historic events on the racing calendar, with hundreds of classic cars competing.

Recent additions to the calendar include a Family Fun Day during the May Bank Holiday weekend, which offers family activities, driving experiences and activities not accustomed to racing tracks, such as medieval jousting, while a festival dedicated to the Mini has also been added. During the week the circuit offers some general test days and driving experiences, and can also be hired out for private testing and track days.

Oulton Park Gold Cup

The Gold Cup was a prize originally awarded to the winner of a non-championship Formula One race held annually at Oulton Park. First ran in 1954, Stirling Moss won the cup and he would go on the win it four more times. Although the race regularly attracted the top teams from across Britain and Europe, the increasing costs of F1 and more countries wishing to have their own Grand Prix led to the Gold Cup falling by the wayside, the last true F1 race taking place in 1972. The Gold Cup would continue albeit with different formulae: Formula 5000, Formula 3000, British Formula One through to British GT and British Touring Cars. Since 2003, the Gold Cup meeting is an event run by the Historic Sports Car Club.

Records 
The current lap record for the International Circuit  is 1:28.669, set by Lucas Foresti, in his Dallara F311 in the British Formula 3 meeting in 2011.

The outright lap record set for the International Circuit in use between 1992 and 2002 was 1:24.68, set by Gareth Rees, in his Reynard 95D in the British Formula Two Championship on 6 July 1996 at the circuit's last running of the Gold Cup as a single-seater event.

On two wheels the outright lap record for the International Circuit is held by Bradley Ray on a Yamaha YZF-R1 on 2022: in race 2 of the British Superbikes category he set a record of 1.33.620.

Lap Records
The official race lap records at Oulton Park are listed as:

Major race results

Formula One Non-World Championship races

European Formula 5000 Championship
The BRSCC's F5000 championship, organised in the UK but taking in events across Europe, started in 1969. The title sponsorship moved from Guards to Rothmans to Shellsport before the series let in Formula One, Formula Two and Formula Atlantic cars for 1976.

International Formula Two Championship

British Formula 3000/Formula Two Championship

British Formula Three season

World Sportscar Championship

European Touring Car Championship

British Touring Car Championship

+  endurance race

British Superbike Championship

+ Replacement for cancelled Brands Hatch race

Further reading

.

Notes

References

External links

Oulton Park
Oulton Park Circuit information
Satellite picture by Google Maps

Motorsport venues in England
Sports venues in Cheshire
British country houses destroyed in the 20th century